The sixteenth season of the American animated television series The Simpsons began on Sunday, November 7, 2004 and contained 21 episodes, beginning with Treehouse of Horror XV. The season contains six hold-over episodes from the season 15 (FABF) production line. Season 16 was released on DVD and Blu-ray in Region 1 on December 3, 2013, Region 2 on December 2, 2013, and Region 4 on December 11, 2013.

Production
This season was the first in which Ian Maxtone-Graham and Matt Selman were credited as executive producers. Originally supposed to air April 10, the episode "The Father, the Son and the Holy Guest Star" was dropped from the week's schedule due to the death of Pope John Paul II, since this episode revolved around Catholicism. As a result, it aired on May 15, 2005 in the United States, while "The Girl Who Slept Too Little", the episode intended for the finale of season 16, became a season 17 episode.

Response

Critical reception
The 16th season of The Simpsons has garnered generally positive reviews from critics, with many noting while the episodes are still good and funny they are of a lesser quality than those of the show's earlier seasons. CraveOnline gave the season a rating of 8.0 out of 10, and spoke highly of its "little pieces of continuity", "sharp parody", and "non sequitur gags". Entertainment Focus gave it 4 out of 5 stars, concluding "Some people have criticised The Simpsons claiming that the show is tired and has passed its prime. We don't agree with those people at all and think The Simpsons has been remarkably consistent in terms of its humour and stories. Sure it may have been eclipsed by the edgier Family Guy in more recent years but The Simpsons is, and always will be, one of the most original and talked-about shows. The Simpsons: Season 16 is another cracking instalment of the hit show and we still, after all these years, just can't get enough. High-Def Digest also gave a 4/5 star rating, saying "As mentioned in the review, there are plenty of laughs to be had in this season, but very few of them come from a place that feels truly genuine and sincere. Sixteen seasons in, it seems that the show is a mixture of been-there-done-that sentiment and perfunctory punch lines. Aside from the so-so image, there's plenty here to keep the die-hard 'Simpsons' fan happy, so this one comes recommended for fans". Cinema Sentries said "This is not something to pick up if you are a general TV fan, or a casual Simpsons fan. The overall quality of the season is not high enough, and you may not get satisfactory enjoyment from them. If you sort of turned your back on the show, this probably isn't the season to check out. However, if you are a Simpsons devotee, then you will want to pick it up". DVDTalk wrote "The Simpsons: Season Sixteen isn't the best of the series' run but it is a very strong collection of truly funny and frequently quite clever doses of animated comedic insanity."

Awards and nominations
For his musical work in "Treehouse of Horror XV", Alf Clausen was nominated for the Outstanding Individual Achievement in Music Composition for a Series (Dramatic Underscore) Emmy award in 2005. In addition, Michael Price won a Writers Guild of America Award for animation for the episode "Mommie Beerest". Also, for his work on "There's Something About Marrying", J. Stewart Burns was nominated for the Writers Guild of America Award for animation. In 2005, "On a Clear Day I Can't See My Sister" was nominated for the Best Television Episodic Comedy Environmental Media Award. Also,  "Goo Goo Gai Pan" was nominated for the Turner Award of the Environmental Media Award. "Future-Drama" was nominated for the Primetime Emmy Award for Outstanding Animated Program (For Programming less than One Hour) In 2006, Don Payne was nominated for the Writers Guild of America Awards for animation for his work in "Thank God, It's Doomsday". In the same year, Matt Warburton was nominated for Writers Guild of America Awards for animation as well for "The Father, the Son and the Holy Guest Star".

Episodes

Blu-ray and DVD releases
The DVD and Blu-ray box set for season sixteen was released by 20th Century Fox Home Entertainment in the United States and Canada on Tuesday, December 3, 2013, eight years after it had completed broadcast on television. As well as every episode from the season, the Blu-ray and DVD releases feature bonus material including deleted scenes, animatics, and commentaries for every episode. The boxart features Professor Frink, and a special limited edition "embossed head case" package was also released.

References

Bibliography

External links
Season 16 at The Simpsons.com

Simpsons season 16
2004 American television seasons
2005 American television seasons